Alan Brown (1 April 1933 - 23 August 2013) was an English cricketer.  Brown was a right-handed batsman who bowled right-arm medium pace.  He was born in Seaton Delaval, Northumberland.

Brown made his debut for Northumberland in the 1958 Minor Counties Championship against Cumberland.  Brown played Minor counties cricket for Northumberland from 1958 to 1979, which included 133 Minor Counties Championship matches. He made his List A debut for Northumberland against Lincolnshire in the 1971 Gillette Cup.  He made 2 further List A appearances for the county, against Bedfordshire and Somerset, both in the 1977 Gillette Cup. In his 3 List A matches for the county, he took 2 wickets at an average of 41.50, with best figures of 2/26.

Playing for Northumberland allowed him to represent Minor Counties North, who he made his debut for in the 1974 Benson & Hedges Cup against Yorkshire.  He made 3 further List A appearances for the team in that competition, the last of which came against Nottinghamshire. In his 4 matches for the team, he took 3 wickets at an average of 21.66, with best figures of 3/21.

References

External links
Alan Brown at ESPNcricinfo
Alan Brown at CricketArchive

1933 births
2013 deaths
People from Seaton Delaval
Cricketers from Northumberland
English cricketers
Northumberland cricketers
Minor Counties cricketers